The Baja California chorus frog (Pseudacris hypochondriaca) is a species of treefrog of Western North America. It was formerly considered as part of the Pacific chorus frog (Pseudacris regilla), but was split and raised to species status in 2006. The species ranges from the West Coast of the United States from Baja California through southern California. Individuals live from sea level to more than 10,000 feet in many types of habitats, reproducing in aquatic settings. It occurs in shades of greens or browns and can change colors over periods of hours and weeks.

Taxonomy 
The naming of this frog has a very confusing history. These frogs have long been known as Pacific chorus frogs (Pseudacris regilla or Hyla regilla). Then, in 2006, Recuero et al. split that taxonomic concept into three species based on mitochondrial DNA comparisons. Recuero et al. attached the name Pseudacris regilla to the northern species, renaming the central species the Sierran tree frog (Pseudacris sierra) and the southern piece the Baja California tree frog (Pseudacris hypochondriaca). Because the paper provided no maps or discussion of how to diagnose the species, it has been an extremely controversial taxonomic revision, but has been incorporated into Amphibian Species of the World 6.0. The taxonomic confusion introduced by this name change means that much of the information about Pseudacris hypochondriaca is attached to the name "Pseudacris regilla".

Cultural importance
Because this species of chorus frog is found near Hollywood, its vocalisations have frequently been used as stock sounds for film and television. As a result, its distinctive advertising call of "ribbit, ribbit" has become a standard representation of frog vocalisations, both in the United States and in the English-speaking world more widely, despite the fact that only it and a few closely related species actually make the sound.

References 

Chorus frogs
Frogs of North America
Amphibians of Mexico
Amphibians of the United States
Fauna of the Baja California Peninsula
Fauna of the California chaparral and woodlands
Natural history of the Peninsular Ranges
Natural history of Baja California
Natural history of San Diego County, California
Amphibians described in 1854
Taxa named by Edward Hallowell (herpetologist)